Lacawac is a historic estate located in Paupack Township and Salem Township, Wayne County, Pennsylvania. It was built in 1903, as a summer estate of Congressman William Connell (1827-1909).  Six of the eight buildings remain.  They are the main house, barn, spring house, pump house, Coachman's Cabin, and ice house.  The buildings are in an Adirondack Great Camp  style.  The main house is a -story frame dwelling with a cross gable roof.  It features two-story porches and the interior is paneled in southern yellow pine.

After Connells death in 1909, the estate was purchased by Louis Arthur Watres for use as a summer home.

In 1966, the property was deeded to a non-profit organization and subsequently used as a nature preserve, ecological field research station and public environmental education facility.

It was listed on the National Register of Historic Places in 1979. Lake Lacawac was listed as a National Natural Landmark in 1968.

References

External links
Lacawac Sanctuary website

Protected areas of Wayne County, Pennsylvania
Clubhouses on the National Register of Historic Places in Pennsylvania
Houses completed in 1903
Houses in Wayne County, Pennsylvania
Nature reserves in Pennsylvania
Museums in Wayne County, Pennsylvania
Historic house museums in Pennsylvania
Nature centers in Pennsylvania
National Register of Historic Places in Wayne County, Pennsylvania
1903 establishments in Pennsylvania
National Natural Landmarks in Pennsylvania